The Kluuvi shopping centre is a shopping centre on Aleksanterinkatu in the Kluuvi district in central Helsinki, Finland. The shopping centre has about 35 businesses (of which the most notable are G-Star RAW, Superdry, Tiger of Sweden, Robert's Coffee, Fred Perry, Misako, George, Gina and Lucy, McDonald's, and Eat & Joy Kluuvi Market Hall). Kluuvi offers 10 new international brand stores first and only in Finland as well as a mix of some interesting Finnish retail concepts and restaurants. In the basement, there is an eco-market hall concept representing local Finnish delicacies from more than 500 Finnish small producers. Also a bread-oven and fish smokery are located in the shop. The shopping centre was opened on 15 March 1989, and was designed by the architect bureau Castren-Jauhiainen-Nuuttila. It was refurbished and reopened with a completely renewed commercial concept 14 October 2011.

The shopping centre comprises the entire western end of the Aasi (donkey) city block. It consists of five buildings (Aleksanterinkatu 7b, Aleksanterinkatu 9, Kluuvikatu 5, Kluuvikatu 7, and Yliopistonkatu 6), which are connected by a light yard covering the entire city block. The Aleksanterinkatu 9 building was an Elanto department store ( 1952) with a granite façade of a relief of a working-class family, sculpted by Aimo Tukiainen. The Kluuvikatu 5 and Yliopistonkatu 6 buildings are old residential and business buildings from the 19th century, and only their façades remain to this day. The Aleksanterinkatu 7b and Kluuvikatu 7 buildings were designed by Castren-Jauhiainen-Nuuttila as supplementary buildings for the city block.

The shopping centre can be accessed with the tram lines 3, 4, and 7, as well as the metro from the Kaisaniemi metro station.

Figures
 Businesses: 35
 Floors: 4
 Rentable area / shopping centre: approx. 10000 m2
 Distribution of area in the shopping centre:
 Parking spaces (P-Kluuvi): 725

See also
 Kluuvi
 Kaisaniemi

External links

References 

Shopping centres in Helsinki
Shops in Helsinki
Shopping malls established in 1989
Kluuvi